Caseyville Township is located in St. Clair County, Illinois, United States. As of the 2010 census, its population was 31,996 and it contained 14,054 housing units.

Geography

Demographics

References

External links
City-data.com
St. Clair County Official Site
Illinois State Archives

Townships in St. Clair County, Illinois
Townships in Illinois